Beykhan Fuchedzhiev (born 1 November 1955) is a Bulgarian boxer. He competed in the men's light flyweight event at the 1976 Summer Olympics.

References

1955 births
Living people
Bulgarian male boxers
Olympic boxers of Bulgaria
Boxers at the 1976 Summer Olympics
Place of birth missing (living people)
Light-flyweight boxers